The 2023 Ontario Tankard, (known as the Port Elgin Chrysler 2023 Ontario Tankard Presented by Bruce Power for sponsorship reasons), the provincial men's curling championship for Southern Ontario, was held from January 24 to 29 at The Plex in Port Elgin, Ontario. The winning Mike McEwen rink represented Ontario at the 2023 Tim Hortons Brier on home soil in London, Ontario where they finished fourth place losing in the 3 vs. 4 Page Playoff game to Wild Card #1 6–3.

It was the second straight year that the event was held in Port Elgin. The 2022 event had been subject to COVID-19 restrictions, capping attendance at 500 people per draw, so the organizers requested that CurlON hold the event in Port Elgin again. The event was held in conjunction with the 2023 Ontario Scotties Tournament of Hearts, the provincial women's curling championship, which were held in Thornhill in 2022 (both events are held together in non-Olympic years).

Qualification process
Twelve teams qualified for the 2023 Ontario Tankard. Two teams qualified via their results in the "Grand Slam" series events (2022 PointsBet Invitational, 2022 National, 2022 Tour Challenge, 2022 Masters). Two teams qualified via their results in the Trillium Tour '1000' series events (Stu Sells Toronto Tankard, Capital Curling Classic, Stroud Sleeman Cash Spiel, Tour Challenge Tier 2, Stu Sells Brantford Nissan Classic). Three teams qualified via their results in the Trillium Tour '500' series events (Gord Carroll Curling Classic, KW Fall Classic, Capital Curling Fall Open, St. Thomas Curling Classic, Comco Cash Spiel, Stu Sells Port Elgin Superspiel, Capital Curling Rideau Open, Stu Sells Cookstown Classic, plus the aforementioned 1000 events). One team (restricted to curlers under the age of 25) qualified via their results in the aforementioned Trillium Tour events, plus the CurlON 250 Event #1. The remaining four teams qualified via an open qualifier.

Teams
The teams are listed as follows:

Round-robin standings
Final round-robin standings

Round-robin results
All draws are listed in Eastern Time (UTC−05:00).

Draw 2
Tuesday, January 24, 9:30 am

Draw 3
Tuesday, January 24, 2:30 pm

Draw 4
Tuesday, January 24, 7:30 pm

Draw 5
Wednesday, January 25, 9:30 am

Draw 7
Wednesday, January 25, 7:30 pm

Draw 8
Thursday, January 26, 9:30 am

Draw 9
Thursday, January 26, 2:30 pm

Draw 10
Thursday, January 26, 7:30 pm

Draw 11
Friday, January 27, 9:30 am

Draw 12
Friday, January 27, 2:30 pm

Championship round
Records from Round Robin carry over to the Championship Round

Championship round results

Draw 13
Friday, January 27, 7:30 pm

Draw 15
Saturday, January 28, 2:30 pm

Playoffs
Source:

Semifinal
Saturday, January 28, 7:30 pm

Final
Sunday, January 29, 3:00 pm

Qualification

Open Qualifier
January 6–8, Welland Curling Club, Welland

References

Bruce County
Ontario Tankard
Ontario Tankard
Ontario Tankard
2023 Tim Hortons Brier